The Motherland Monument is a monumental statue in Kyiv, the capital of Ukraine. The sculpture is a part of the National Museum of the History of Ukraine in the Second World War.

Description
Initially, the statue was drawn by the sculptor Yevgeny Vuchetich. Vuchetich based the statue on the Ukrainian painter Nina Danyleiko.
 When Vuchetich died in 1974, the project was continued by Vasyl Borodai, who used Ukrainian sculptor Halyna Kalchenko, a daughter of the prime minister of Ukraine Nikifor Kalchenko, as the model.

The memorial hall of the museum displays marble plaques with carved names of more than 11,600 soldiers and over 200 workers of the home-front honored during the war with the title of the Hero of the Soviet Union and the Hero of Socialist Labour. On the hill beneath the museum, traditional flower shows are held. The sword of the statue was cut because the tip of the sword was higher than the cross of the Kyiv Pechersk Lavra.

Background
However, this did not go ahead. Instead, according to legend, in the 1970s, a group of Communist Party officials and Soviet sculptor Yevgeny Vuchetich looked across at the hills by the Lavra and decided the panorama needed a war memorial. Vuchetich had designed the other two most famous giant Soviet war memorials, The Motherland Calls in Volgograd and the Soviet soldier carrying German infant constructed after the war in East Berlin. The statue was modeled after one of his coworkers, Mila Hazinsky, however after Vuchetich died in 1974, the design of the memorial was substantially reworked and only the eyes and eyebrows remained from the original face. It was then completed under the guidance of Vasyl Borodai.

Final plans for the statue were made in 1978, with construction beginning in 1979. It was controversial, with many criticising the costs involved and claimed the funds could have been better spent elsewhere. When director of construction Ivan Petrovich was asked to confirm the costs of 9 million rubles, he responded that this was a conservative estimate. The statue was opened in 1981 in a ceremony attended by Soviet General Secretary Leonid Brezhnev.

In modern-day Kyiv, the statue remains controversial, with some claiming it should be pulled down and its metal used for more functional purposes.

In April 2015, the parliament of Ukraine outlawed Soviet and communist symbols, street names and monuments, as part of the decommunization of Ukraine. However, World War II monuments are excluded from these laws. Director of the Ukrainian Institute of National Remembrance Volodymyr Viatrovych stated in February 2018 that the Soviet hammer and sickle on the shield of the monument should be removed to comply with the country's decommunization laws and replace it with the Ukrainian trident. , despite the derussification and decommunization occurring in Ukraine in response to the 2022 Russian invasion of Ukraine, the monument has not yet been modified. The current plans suggest replacing the Soviet elements in 2023.

In popular culture
A scene in the 2006 novel World War Z depicts a Ukrainian tank commander and his surviving men fleeing in their vehicles from an abandoned and burning Kyiv under the watchful gaze of the monument.

The monument was the site of a pit stop during the tenth episode of The Amazing Race 10.

The monument is prominently featured in the music video for the song "Get Out" by the Scottish band Frightened Rabbit.

Gallery

See also
 List of tallest statues
 Mother Motherland (Saint Petersburg)
 Mound of Glory
 Memorial Complex "Hall of Remembrance"

References

External links
 Official website
 Information about visiting, exposition and fees
 Museum Collections

1981 sculptures
Soviet military memorials and cemeteries in Ukraine
Monuments and memorials in Kyiv
Landmarks in Kyiv
Steel sculptures in Ukraine
1981 in Ukraine
Allegorical sculptures in Ukraine
Buildings and structures completed in 1981
Buildings and structures in Kyiv
Colossal statues in Ukraine
Architecture in the Soviet Union
Symbols of Kyiv
Victory monuments
National personifications
Outdoor sculptures in Ukraine
Tourist attractions in Kyiv
Tourism in Kyiv
Sculptures in the Soviet Union